Délice de Bourgogne is a French cow's milk cheese from the Burgundy region of France. It was first created in 1975 by Jean Lincet at Fromagerie Lincet. It is a soft-ripened triple-cream cheese. The creamy texture results from the extra cream that is added during the cheese-making process.

Description: 
 White and bloomy rind
 Homogeneous paste – from ivory to pale yellow color
 Aromas of mushrooms near the rind
 Fine and delicate texture - mild and slightly acidic

Pairing:
 Whites wines (i.e. Champagne, Meursault, Chablis Grand Cru)
 Red wines (i.e. Epineuil)

There are two kinds of Délice de Bourgogne:
 Délice de Bourgogne 2kg (aging = 2 weeks)
 Délice de Bourgogne 200g (aging = 1 week)

See also 
 Brillat Savarin
 Fromagerie Lincet

French cheeses
Cow's-milk cheeses